The Udzungwa red colobus (Piliocolobus gordonorum), also known as the Uzungwa red colobus or Iringa red colobus, is a species of primate in the family Cercopithecidae. It is endemic to riverine and montane forest in the Udzungwa Mountains in Kilolo District of Iringa Region in Tanzania. It is threatened by habitat loss.

References

Uzungwa red colobus
Endemic fauna of Tanzania
Mammals of Tanzania
Endangered fauna of Africa
Uzungwa red colobus
Taxonomy articles created by Polbot
Primates of Africa